The 2003 Atlantic Sun Conference baseball tournament was held at Melching Field at Conrad Park on the campus of Stetson University in DeLand, Florida, from May 26 through 29.   won its second tournament championship to earn the Atlantic Sun Conference's automatic bid to the 2003 NCAA Division I baseball tournament.

Seeding
The top six teams (based on conference results) from the conference earn invites to the tournament.

Results

All-Tournament Team
The following players were named to the All-Tournament Team.

Tournament Most Valuable Player
Gordie Gronkowski was named Tournament Most Valuable Player.  Gronkowski was an infielder for Jacksonville.

References

Tournament
ASUN Conference Baseball Tournament
Atlantic Sun baseball tournament
Atlantic Sun baseball tournament